Tonk is a constituency of the Rajasthan Legislative Assembly covering the city of Tonk in the Tonk district of Rajasthan, India.

Tonk is one of eight assembly constituencies in the Tonk–Sawai Madhopur (Lok Sabha constituency). Since 2008, this assembly constituency is numbered 96 amongst 200 constituencies.

Currently this seat belongs to the INC candidate Sachin Pilot,  the former Deputy Chief Minister of Rajasthan who won in 2018 Rajasthan Legislative Assembly election by defeating BJP candidate Yunus Khan, who was the transport minister in Vasundhara Raje government, by a margin of 54,179 votes.

Geographical scope
The constituency comprises parts of   Tonk tehsil and Todaraisingh tehsil (Partly) – (I) ILRC Khareda  (II) ILRC Lamba Kalan.

Member of the Legislative Assembly

Elections Result

2018 Assembly Election Result
In 2018, Tonk legislative assembly constituency had total 2,24,106 electors. Total number of valid vote was 1,71,566. Indian National Congress candidate Sachin Pilot won and became MLA from this seat. He secured total 1,09,040 votes. Bharatiya Janata Party candidate Yunus Khan stood second with total 54,861 votes. He lost by 54,179 votes.

2013 Assembly Election Result
In 2013, Tonk legislative assembly constituency had total 1,89,707 electors. Total number of valid vote was 1,42,351. Bharatiya Janata Party candidate Ajit Singh Mehta won and became MLA from this seat. He secured total 66,845 votes. Independent candidate Saud Saidi stood second with total 36,502 votes. He lost by 30,343 votes.

References

Assembly constituencies of Rajasthan
Tonk district